Colonel William Kendall (1621-1686) was an early American politician. He was the 21st Speaker of the Virginia House of Burgesses, a position he held in 1685. He was considered "one of the foremost men of his time."

Politics
In 1657, 1662, 1663, and 1666, Kendall was a Burgess for Northampton County, Virginia. In 1660, he was a Collector, followed by becoming a Commissioner in 1667.

In 1679, he was sent with Col. Nathaniel Littleton to New York to discuss Indian affairs with Governor Edmund Andros.

In 1685, he became the 21st Speaker of the Virginia House of Burgesses.

Personal life
Kendall was born in Brinton, Norfolk, England, in 1621. He was the seventh child of John Kendall, a taylor, and Anne Pleasance Kendall. In the early 1640s, he moved from Brinton to Yarmouth, England, and married a woman named Ruth in 1644. She died around 1649. Author John Ruston Pagan speculates Kendall sailed aboard the Peter and John to America in the summer of 1650.

His will was dated December 29, 1685, and was proved on July 28, 1686. In it, "he names his son-in-law Hancock Lee and Mary, his wife, and son William Kendall." His son William was a member of the House of Burgesses for Northampton County as well, in 1688 and then 1692–1693. William II had two sons, named William III and John, and three daughters.

Kendall's daughter Mary Kendall married Hancock Lee, another burgess.

References

English emigrants
Speakers of the Virginia House of Burgesses
1621 births
1686 deaths
People from Brinton, Norfolk
Military personnel from Norfolk